The Arena de Lachine is a 1,500-seat multi-purpose arena in Lachine, Quebec, Canada.  It is home to the Les Maroons de Lachine Tier II Junior "A" ice hockey team of the Quebec Junior AAA Hockey League.

It is located at 1925 rue Saint-Antoine.

References

Indoor arenas in Quebec
Indoor ice hockey venues in Quebec
Sports venues in Montreal
Lachine, Quebec